Nickel is a chemical element.

Nickel may also refer to:

People
 Nickel (surname)
 Nickel Ashmeade (born 1990), Jamaican athlete
 Nickel Chand (born 1995), Fijian footballer
 Nickel Hoffmann (1536–1592), German stonemason
 Nickel Leung, Hong Kong educator

Coins and tokens
 Nickel (Canadian coin), a five cent coin introduced in 1922
 Nickel (United States coin), a five cent coin introduced in 1866
 Half dime, a U.S. five cent coin produced in various years in the range 1792–1873 (sometimes called a "nickel" due to its face value)
 Three-cent nickel, a U.S. coin (1865–1889)
 Indian Head cent, a U.S. coin (1859–1864) nicknamed the "nickel"

Games and sports
 Nickel defense, a defense formation in American and Canadian football
 Nickel Trophy, awarded to the winner of the football game between North Dakota State University and the University of North Dakota

Other uses
 Nickel, a shade of gray
 Nickel Theatre, St. John's, Newfoundland, Canada
 Nickel Film Festival, St. John's, Newfoundland
 Nickel (hacker group)

See also

 Nikel, a small city in Russia
 Nickle (disambiguation)
 Nickels (disambiguation)
 Nichol, a surname
 Nichols (disambiguation)
 Nicole (disambiguation)